Oyster Cove is a semi-rural locality in the local government areas (LGA) of Kingborough and Huon Valley in the Hobart and South-east LGA regions of Tasmania. The 2016 census has a population of 319 for the state suburb of Oyster Cove.

History 
Oyster Cove was gazetted as a locality in 1968.
It was originally a convict station. In 1847, 47 Aboriginal Tasmanians that had survived forced removal from the Tasmanian mainland to Wybalenna, Flinders Island, were moved to Oyster Cove. The locality was returned to the indigenous people of Tasmania in 1995 under the Aboriginal Lands Act 1995, and in 1999 Oyster Cove was declared an Indigenous Protected Area.

Oyster Cove Post Office opened in 1897 and closed in 1924. It re-opened in 1927 and closed in 1964.

In 1894, teacher Lily Poulett-Harris established the first woman's cricket league in Australia at Oyster Cove, The Oyster Cove Ladies Club.

Geography
The shore of the D’Entrecasteaux Channel forms the eastern boundary.

Road infrastructure 
The Channel Highway (Route B68) passes through from north to south. Route C626 (Nicholls Rivulet Road) starts at an intersection with B68 and runs west until it exits.

See also
 English Passengers by Matthew Kneale

References 

Southern Tasmania
Protected areas of Tasmania
Localities of Kingborough Council
Towns in Tasmania
Localities of Huon Valley Council